Panasonic Lumix DMC-TZ30 (also known as the DMC-ZS20 in the USA) is a digital camera by Panasonic Lumix. The highest-resolution pictures it records is 14.1 megapixels, through its 24mm Ultra Wide-Angle Leica DC VARIO-ELMAR.

Property
24 mm LEICA DC
20x optical zoom
High Sensitivity MOS sensor
Integrated GPS
POWER Optical Image Stabilization with Active mode
Full HD Video Recording

References

External links

DMC-TZ30 on panasonic.it
Panasonic Lumix DMC-TZ30 review

Point-and-shoot cameras
TZ30